"My Own Soul's Warning" is a song by American rock band the Killers from their sixth studio album, Imploding the Mirage (2020). It was released on June 17, 2020, as the third single from the album.

Background
Album lead track, "My Own Soul's Warning" was written near the end of the Imploding the Mirage sessions. The cover artwork is by American artist Thomas Blackshear.

Music videos
Two music videos have been made for the song.

First video
The first music video, released via YouTube on July 16, 2020, is a sneak peek from a forthcoming short film with director Sting Lee tied to the Killers' then-upcoming album Imploding the Mirage. The film will premiere on Apple Music. The music video has snippets reminding of an Americana theme. There are a number of stories going on.

Second video
The second music video, directed by Michael Hili, premiered on YouTube on August 20, 2020, just over a month after the first video. It features frontman Brandon Flowers and drummer Ronnie Vannucci Jr. going on a road trip together in a pickup truck through cornfields and snow-covered forests.

Awards and accolades

Uproxx listed it as No. 5 on its Best Songs of 2020.  NME listed it as No. 14 on its Best Songs of 2020.

Credits and personnel
Credits adapted from the liner notes of Imploding the Mirage.

Recording locations
 Recorded at Subtle McNugget Studios (Los Angeles), Electro-Vox Recording Studios (Los Angeles), and Battle Born Studios (Las Vegas)
 Mixed at Subtle McNugget Studios (Los Angeles) and Effie Street Studios (Los Angeles)
 Mastered at The Lodge (New York City)

Personnel
The Killers
 Brandon Flowers – vocals, synth, organ, glockenspiel
 Ronnie Vannucci Jr. – drums, percussion

Additional personnel

 Jonathan Rado – production, bass, organ, guitar, cello, string synth, piano
 Shawn Everett – production, recording, mixing
 Ivan Wayman – engineering
 Robert Root – engineering
 Ariel Rechtshaid – mixing
 Bobby Lee Parker – guitar
 Rob Moose – strings
 Roger Joseph Manning Jr. – keys
 Brian D'Addario – acoustic guitar
 Emily Lazar – mastering

Charts

Weekly charts

Year-end charts

Release history

References

2020 singles
2020 songs
The Killers songs
Island Records singles
Songs written by Brandon Flowers